The First Responders is an ongoing South Korean television series starring Kim Rae-won, Son Ho-jun, and Gong Seung-yeon. Its first season premiered on SBS TV on November 12, 2022, and aired every Friday and Saturday at 22:00 (KST), while the second season is scheduled for release in the second half of 2023.

The series will also be available for streaming on Disney+ in selected regions.

Synopsis
A joint response field log between the police who catch criminals and firefighters who catch fires. The police station and the fire station jointly respond to fierce scenes between crime, disasters and emergencies.

Cast

Main
 Kim Rae-won as Jin Ho-gae, a police detective team inspector in Taewon who was formerly from Regional Investigation Unit.
 Son Ho-jun as Bong Do-jin, a firefighter at Taewon Fire Station (Fire Bridge) who currently works as fire investigator.
 Gong Seung-yeon as Song Seol, a paramedic at Taewon Fire Station who cares about even the smallest wounds that bring tears and sleep.

Supporting

People around Taewon Police Station
 Seo Hyun-chul as Baek Cham, the chief detective of the Taewon Police Station.
 Kang Ki-doong as Gongmyung Pil, the most talented sergeant with great agility and good relationships and the pillar of Taewon Police Station.
 Ji Woo as Bong An-na, Chief of the Science Investigation Team of Taewon Police Station, Bong Do-jin's younger sister.

People around Taewon Fire Station
 Woo Mi-hwa as Dok Go-soon, on-site fire police and Commander of Taewon Fire Station.
 Jung Jin-woo as Choi Ki-soo, a rescue worker at Taewon Fire Station who has a softer heart than anyone else.
 Lee Woo-je as Han Dong-woo, doctor at Taewon Fire Station, Song Seol's partner ambulance firefighter.

People around Taewon General Hospital
 Yang Jong-wook as Cha Jae-hee, Emergency Medicine Doctor a.k.a Teacher Cha. A specialist with a double board for emergency medicine and general surgery. 
 Lee Hwa-jeong as Han Su-jin, majoring in Emergency Medicine, Taewon General Hospital's Emergency Medicine major (resident) 2nd year. 
 Heo Ji-won as Kwak Kyung-jun, Taewon General Hospital's Emergency Room head nurse. He was the real culprit who kidnapped Kim Hyeon-seo 7 years ago.

Others
 Son Ji-yoon as Yoon Hong, a forensic officer in the autopsy room.
 Jo Seung-yeon as Jin Cheol-jung, prosecutor of the Eastern District Attorney's Office and Jin Ho-gae's father. 
 Lee Do-yeop as Ma Tae-hwa, Ma Jung-do's son, the leader of the next presidential candidate.
 Jeon Kook-hwan as Ma Jung-do, member of the National Assembly, representative of the next presidential candidate, Ma Tae-hwa's father. 
 Seo Jae-gyu as Yeom Sang-goo, a prosecutor at the Eastern District Attorney's Office.
 Jo Hee-bong as Yang Chi-young, Ma Tae-hwa's lawyer, multiple CPA Accountant Certifications.

Extended
 Lee Ji-won as Kim So-hee, the kidnapped victim in Episode 1. 
 Yoon Seok-hyun as Jo Doo-chil, the murderer who tried to kill Kim So-hee and met Jin Ho-gae again in prison. 
 Jung Jae-eun as Kim So-hee's mother. 
 Kim Min-seo as Kim Hyeon-seo, high school student who attempts suicide due to blackmail.
 Cha Seong-je as Yang Jun-tae, Hyeon-seo's class president. The person who was the direct cause of Hyeon-seo's suicide, he introduced illegal internet gambling to Hyeon-seo. 
 Noh Sussanna as Woo Mi-young, Park Tae-hoon's ex-girlfriend. Later revealed as Park Tae-hoon's killer. 
 Won Woo-jun as Park Tae-hoon - reported missing while preparing for civil service exam. Woo Mi-young's ex-boyfriend. 
 Jung Wook-jin as Choi Seok-doo, a part-time employee in a convenience store, and is the real drug buyer.
 Ji Hyung-jun as Kim Hyung
 Kwak Ji-hye as Song Ha-eun, 18 year old highschool student who aborted her baby and disposed it with her mother's bag.
 Lee So-ee as Kim Hyeon-seo, a girl who was kidnapped 7 years ago, whom Jin Ho-gae was the last person to meet.

Special appearances
 Yoon Seo-hyun as Cho Man-sik, Kim Hyeon-seo's real father.
 Lee Tae-gum as Min Won-in, the owner of the car that Choi Ki-soo drives.

Production

Casting
On January 24, 2022, actors Kim Rae-won, Son Ho-jun, and Gong Seung-yeon were confirmed to have joined the cast as the leads.

Filming
On March 3, 2022, it was reported that PD Lee Him-chan, who was working as a producer for The First Responders, had died on January 30, and his family complained that it was due to the pressure of hard work. Due to the incident, filming for the series was halted in February 2022, and it was resumed in May.

Release
The series was originally scheduled for release in the first half of 2022, but was postponed to the second half of the year.

On January 5, 2022, it was reported that the series will have a total of two seasons with 12 episodes per season. In September, it was officially announced that the first season will air on November 12, while the second season will air in the second half of 2023.

On November 22, 2022, writer Min Ji-eun in an interview, confirmed that there will be a second season.

Original soundtrack

Part 1

Part 2

Part 3

Part 4

Part 5

Part 6

Viewership

Awards and nominations

Notes

References

External links
  
  at Mega Monster's website 
 
 
  

Korean-language television shows
Seoul Broadcasting System television dramas
Television series by Mega Monster
Television series by Studio S
2022 South Korean television series debuts